The men's discus throw at the 2014 IPC Athletics European Championships was held at the Swansea University Stadium from 18 to 23 August.

In the F56 event several F54 and F55 athletes entered as no competition in their classification was available. Although he finished fourth in the F56 event, Serbia's Drazenko Mitrovic (F54) recorded a distance of 33.68m with his final throw, beating his own world record set in London during the 2012 Summer Paralympics.

Medalists

Results

F11

F12

F34

F37/38

F42

F44

F46

F52

F56

F57

See also
List of IPC world records in athletics

References

discus throw
Discus throw at the World Para Athletics European Championships